Altındere Valley National Park, established on September 9, 1987, is a national park in northeastern Turkey. The national park is located in Maçka district of Trabzon Province. It is most well known for containing the Sumela Monastery

References

National parks of Turkey
Valleys of Turkey
Geography of Trabzon Province
Landforms of Trabzon Province
Tourist attractions in Trabzon Province
1987 establishments in Turkey
Protected areas established in 1987